Caio may refer to:

 Caio (name), a Portuguese given name derived from the Latin given name Gaius
 Caio, Carmarthenshire, a village in west Wales
 Caio (moth), a genus
 Italian destroyer Caio Duilio, a destroyer of the Italian Navy

See also
Caius (disambiguation)
Gaius